Jens Patrik Wålemark (born 14 October 2001) is a Swedish footballer who plays as a attacking midfielder and winger for Eredivisie club Feyenoord.

Club career 
In July 2020 he started his first match in Allsvenskan, and in one hour he managed to score a goal, get two assists and be fouled to secure a penalty kick.

In January 2022 he transferred to the Dutch club Feyenoord. He scored his first goal for the club on April 10, scoring Feyenoord's fourth goal in a 4–1 away victory over Heracles Almelo.

Honours
Feyenoord
 UEFA Europa Conference League runner-up: 2021–22

References

2001 births
Living people
Swedish footballers
Association football midfielders
Qviding FIF players
BK Häcken players
Feyenoord players
Allsvenskan players
Eredivisie players
Swedish expatriate footballers
Expatriate footballers in the Netherlands
Swedish expatriate sportspeople in the Netherlands